This article contains several lists of  ambassadors and high commissioners of Sri Lanka.

Resident heads of mission

Heads of mission to non-sovereign territories

Heads of mission to international organisations

Other senior diplomatic representatives

See also
 Ministry of External Affairs (Sri Lanka)
 List of Sri Lankan non-career diplomats

Notes

References
 

 
Sri Lankan government officials
Sri Lanka
Lists of Sri Lankan politicians